The Arara people, also called Arara do Pará are an indigenous people of Brazil, living in the state of Pará, Brazil. They are known for both their prowess in warfare and trophy-keeping practices, as well as their ability to interact and accommodate non-native peoples. They maintained a nomadic existence and frequently intermarried with other tribes. The largest Arara settlement is Laranjal village.

History
The Arara have been in contact with non-native peoples since the 1850s. They had peaceful encounters with outsiders along the Xingu and Iriri Rivers. From 1889 to 1894, they were harassed by rubber tappers.

Language
Arara people speak the Arára language, also known as the Ajujure language, which is a Karib language. Its ISO 639-3 language code is "aap". A few Arara people also speak Portuguese.

See also
Indigenous peoples in Brazil
List of indigenous peoples in Brazil

Notes

Ethnic groups in Brazil
Indigenous peoples in Brazil
Indigenous peoples of Eastern Brazil